Edward Sugden may refer to:

Edward Sugden (Methodist) (1854–1935), Methodist minister, first master of Queen's College, University of Melbourne 
Edward Sugden, 1st Baron St Leonards (1781–1875), English jurist and Conservative politician.